Marko Oštir (born 7 June 1977 in Slovenj Gradec) is a retired professional handball player.

Information
Height:  
Weight:  
Position: line player

References

Eurohandball.com profile

Living people
Sportspeople from Slovenj Gradec
Slovenian male handball players
Olympic handball players of Slovenia
Handball players at the 2004 Summer Olympics
1977 births